Sean McNamara may refer to:

Sean McNamara (Nip/Tuck), fictional character on the television series Nip/Tuck
Sean McNamara (filmmaker) (born 1962), American film writer, director, and producer